Guillaume Emmanuel Guignard, vicomte de Saint-Priest (4 March 1776, in Constantinople29 March 1814) was a French émigré general who fought in the Russian army during the French Revolutionary Wars and the Napoleonic Wars.

He was the eldest son of prominent émigré diplomat François-Emmanuel Guignard, comte de Saint-Priest (1735–1821), one of King Louis XVI of France's last ministers, and Constance Wilhelmine de Saint-Priest.

Guillaume Emmanuel became a Major-General in the Russian army under Emperor Alexander I of Russia, and fought against the forces of Napoleon. Some weeks before the Battle of Leipzig, he and his cavalry finally defeated the troops of French brigade general François Basile Azemar in the Battle of Großdrebnitz. Saint-Priest was defeated and mortally wounded during the 1814 Allied invasion of France in the Battle of Reims and died two weeks later at Laon.

References

1776 births
1814 deaths
Military personnel from Istanbul
French generals
People of the French Revolution
Russian commanders of the Napoleonic Wars
Guillaume Emmanuel Guignard, vicomte de Saint-Priest
Recipients of the Order of St. George of the Second Degree
Recipients of the Order of St. George of the Third Degree
Recipients of the Order of St. Anna, 1st class
Recipients of the Order of St. Vladimir, 2nd class
Knights of the Order of St John
Recipients of the Pour le Mérite (military class)
Recipients of the Gold Sword for Bravery